Mastinocerini is a tribe of beetles in the family Phengodidae. There are at least 190 described species in Mastinocerini.

Genera
 Astraptor Murray, 1868
 Brasilocerus Wittmer, 1963
 Cenophengus LeConte, 1861
 Cephalophrixothrix Wittmer, 1976
 Decamastinocerus Wittmer, 1988
 Distremocephalus Wittmer, 1976
 Eurymastinocerus Wittmer, 1976
 Euryognathus Wittmer, 1976
 Euryopa Gorham, 1881
 Howdenia Wittmer, 1976
 Mastinocerus Solier, 1849
 Mastinomorphus Wittmer, 1976
 Mastinowittmerus Zaragoza, 1984
 Neophengus Wittmer, 1976
 Nephromma Wittmer, 1976
 Oxymastinocerus Wittmer, 1963
 Paraptorthodius Schaeffer, 1904
 Phrixothrix E. Olivier, 1909
 Pseudomastinocerus Wittmer, 1963
 Ptorthodiellus Wittmer, 1976
 Ptorthodius Gorham, 1881
 Spangleriella Wittmer, 1988
 Steneuryopa Wittmer, 1986
 Stenophrixothrix Wittmer, 1963
 Taximastinocerus Wittmer, 1963

References

 O'Keefe, Sean T. / Arnett, Ross H. Jr., Michael C. Thomas, Paul E. Skelley, and J. H. Frank, eds. (2002). "Family 61. Phengodidae LeConte, 1861". American Beetles, vol. 2: Polyphaga: Scarabaeoidea through Curculionoidea, 181–186.

Further reading

 Arnett, R. H. Jr., M. C. Thomas, P. E. Skelley and J. H. Frank. (eds.). (21 June 2002). American Beetles, Volume II: Polyphaga: Scarabaeoidea through Curculionoidea. CRC Press LLC, Boca Raton, Florida .
 
 Richard E. White. (1983). Peterson Field Guides: Beetles. Houghton Mifflin Company.

Elateroidea